A list of films produced by the Bengali language film industry based in Kolkata in the year 1962.

Critically acclaimed films of 1962

 Kancher Swarga [Award: Won the President's Award, India, 1962, Silver Medal for Best Bengali Film]
 Bhagini Nibedita [Award: Won the President's Award, India, 1961, Gold Medal for Best Film]
 Abhijan [Awards: Won the President's Award, India, 1962, Certificate of Merit]
 Dadathakur [Awards: President's Award, India, 1962, Gold Medal for Best Film]
 Bipasha
 Hansuli Banker Upakatha
 Kumari Mon
 Kanchenjungha
 Shiulibari

January – March

April – June

July – September

October – December

References

1962
Lists of 1962 films by country or language
Films, Bengali